Roger Lowrey White (1 June 1928 – 16 February 2000) was a British Conservative Party politician and company director.

At the 1970 general election, he was elected as Member of Parliament (MP) for Gravesend in Kent, a marginal seat which traditionally was won by the party in power (the 1970 general election resulted in a surprise victory for the Conservatives).  At the general election in February 1974, which resulted in a hung parliament, White lost to the Labour candidate John Ovenden.

White was a member of the right-wing Conservative Monday Club.

References 

 Times Guide to the House of Commons February 1974

External links 
 

UK MPs 1970–1974
Conservative Party (UK) MPs for English constituencies
1928 births
2000 deaths